{{Infobox election
| election_name     = 2004 United States Senate election in Ohio
| country           = Ohio
| type              = presidential
| ongoing           = no
| previous_election = 1998 United States Senate election in Ohio
| previous_year     = 1998
| next_election     = 2010 United States Senate election in Ohio
| next_year         = 2010
| election_date     = November 2, 2004

| image1            = 
| nominee1          = George Voinovich
| party1            = Republican Party (United States)
| popular_vote1     = 3,464,651
| percentage1       = 63.9%

| image2            = 
| nominee2          = Eric Fingerhut
| party2            = Democratic Party (United States)
| popular_vote2     = 1,961,249
| percentage2       = 36.1%

| map_image         = 2004 United States Senate election in Ohio results map by county.svg
| map_size          = 210px
| map_caption       = County resultsVoinovich:     
| title             = U.S. Senator
| before_election   = George Voinovich
| before_party      = Republican Party (United States)
| after_election    = George Voinovich
| after_party       = Republican Party (United States)
}}

The 2004 United States Senate election in Ohio''' took place on November 2, 2004. It was concurrent with elections to the United States House of Representatives and the presidential election. Incumbent Republican U.S. Senator George Voinovich won re-election to a second term with the highest raw vote total in Ohio history.

Republican primary

Candidates 
 George Voinovich, incumbent U.S. Senator since 1999
 John Mitchel

Results

Democratic primary

Candidates 
 Eric Fingerhut, State Senator and former U.S. Representative from Ohio's 19th congressional district
 Norbert Dennerll, former Cleveland City Councilman

Results

General election

Candidates 
 George Voinovich (R), incumbent U.S. Senator and former Governor
 Eric Fingerhut (D), State Senator and former U.S. Representative from Ohio's 19th congressional district
 Helen Meyers (write-in)

Campaign 
A popular U.S. Senator, Voinovich was the heavy favorite to win the election. He had over $9 million in the bank, while his opponent barely had $1.5 million. Fingerhut's campaign was overshadowed by the possible campaign of Democrat and former Mayor of Cincinnati Jerry Springer, who eventually declined to run.

Voinovich is a moderate on some issues. He supports gun control and amnesty for undocumented immigrants.

Surprisingly, Voinovich's biggest advantage was getting support from the most Democratic-leaning county in the state, Cuyahoga County, Ohio. Kerry carried it with almost 67% of the vote, by far his best performance in the state in 2004. It is the home of Cleveland and it is also most populous county in the state. Voinovich was a former mayor of Cleveland. In addition, he catered to Cleveland's large Jewish population by visiting Israel six times as a first-term U.S. Senator. He also consistently voted for aid to Israel through foreign appropriations bills. He's supported resolutions reaffirming Israel's right to self-defense and condemned Palestinian terrorist attacks. In addition, Fingerhut's home base was in the Cleveland area, and therefore he had to cut in through the incumbent's home base in order to even make the election close.

In a September University of Cincinnati poll, the incumbent lead 64% to 34%. In an October ABC News poll, Voinovich was winning 60% to 35%. He led across almost all demographic groups Only among Democrats, non-whites, liberals, and those who pick health care as #1 issue favor Fingerhut. The election coincided with the presidential election, where Ohio was a swing state. 27% of Voinovich's supporters preferred U.S. Senator John Kerry for president.

Predictions

Polling

Results

By congressional district
Voinovich won 17 of 18 congressional districts, including 6 that have democratic congressman and 5 that voted for John Kerry in the presidential race.

See also 
 2004 United States Senate elections

Notes

References

United States Senate
Ohio
2004